Thetis, minor planet designation 17 Thetis, is a stony asteroid from the inner regions of the asteroid belt, approximately 90 kilometers in diameter. It was discovered on 17 April 1852, by German astronomer Robert Luther at Bilk Observatory in Düsseldorf, Germany who deferred to Friedrich Wilhelm August Argelander the naming his first asteroid discovery after Thetis from Greek mythology.

Description 
The asteroid orbits the Sun at a distance of 2.1–2.8 AU once every 3 years and 11 months (1,419 days). Its orbit has an eccentricity of 0.13 and an inclination of 6° with respect to the ecliptic.

The spectrum of this object indicates that it is an S-type asteroid with both low and high calcium forms of pyroxene on the surface, along with less than 20% olivine. The high-calcium form of pyroxene forms 40% or more of the total pyroxene present, indicating a history of igneous rock deposits. This suggests that the asteroid underwent differentiation by melting, creating a surface of basalt rock.

The mass of Thetis has been calculated from perturbations by 4 Vesta and 11 Parthenope.  In 2007, Baer and Chesley calculated Thetis to have a mass of 1.2 kg with a density of 3.21 g/cm3.

One Thetidian stellar occultation was observed from Oregon in 1999. However, the event was not timed.

This minor planet was named after Thetis, the mother of Achilles in Greek mythology.

Notes

References

External links 

 2011-Apr-22 Occultation (Durech Model) / (2011 Asteroidal Occultation Results for North America)
 Asteroid Lightcurve Database (LCDB), query form (info )
 Dictionary of Minor Planet Names, Google books
 Asteroids and comets rotation curves – (17) Thetis at Observatoire de Genève, Raoul Behrend
 Discovery Circumstances: Numbered Minor Planets (1)-(5000) – Minor Planet Center
 
 

Background asteroids
Thetis
Thetis
S-type asteroids (Tholen)
Sl-type asteroids (SMASS)
18520417